9 Full Moons is a 2013 American romantic drama film directed by Tomer Almagor and starring Amy Seimetz, Bret Roberts and Donal Logue. It was released in theaters in 2014.

Plot
Frankie is a hard-drinking woman fresh out of a bad marriage. She wanders East Los Angeles looking for castoff furniture and clothing, which she sometimes sells for spending money. Otherwise, she hangs out with local musicians as an opportunity to meet people.

Lev is a limousine driver who dreams of making it in the music business. He meets Frankie in a dive bar and they hook up, quickly escalating to the point where she moves in with him. Lev also makes a musical connection with Charlie King Nash, a well-known roots-rocker who has hit a creative wall and welcomes the chance to make a new start.

Meantime, Lev and Frankie try to work through the ups and downs of a serious relationship and decide whether each is ready for it.

Cast
Amy Seimetz as Frankie
Bret Roberts as Lev
Donal Logue as Charlie King Nash
Foster Timms as Spencer Walsh
Brian McGuire as Ronnie
Dale Dickey as Billie
Harry Dean Stanton as Dimitri
James Duval as Terry
Joey Capone as Sam

Critical reception
9 Full Moons was originally released June 6, 2013, at the Seattle International Film Festival and made the festival circuit in Los Angeles, Mexico and The Bahamas. It was nominated for Best International Feature at the Raindance Film Festival while Seimetz won the Agave Award for Outstanding Achievement in Acting at the Oaxaca FilmFest. Film Threat called Moons "an uncommon love story ... driven by complex characters" and said Seimetz was perfectly cast.

The film premiered in theaters on November 7, 2014. Its accompanying review in the Los Angeles Times called Moons "a gentle millennial spin on Barfly" that rings true, even though a back-story "proves a waste of Harry Dean Stanton".

References

External links
 
 

2013 films
2013 romantic drama films
American romantic drama films
2010s English-language films
2010s American films